The 2018–19 Hong Kong Second Division League was the 5th season of the Hong Kong Second Division since it became the third-tier football league in Hong Kong in 2014–15. The season began on 9 September 2018 and ended on 26 May 2019.

Teams

Changes from last season

From Second Division

Promoted to First Division
 Happy Valley 
 Central & Western

Relegated to Third Division
 Kwai Tsing 
 GFC Friends 
 Sai Kung 
 Fukien

To Second Division

Relegated from First Division
 Sun Hei
 Tung Sing 
 Kwun Tong 
 Wan Chai

Promoted from Third Division
 North District 
 St. Joseph's

League table

References

Hong Kong Second Division League seasons
2018–19 in Hong Kong football